Hartmut Heidemann (5 June 1941 – 31 July 2022) was a German footballer who played as a left-back. He spent nine seasons in the Bundesliga with MSV Duisburg. He also represented West Germany in three friendlies.

Honours
MSV Duisburg
 Bundesliga runner-up: 1963–64
 DFB-Pokal runner-up: 1965–66

References

External links
 

1941 births
2022 deaths
German footballers
Association football fullbacks
Germany international footballers
Bundesliga players
MSV Duisburg players
Footballers from Duisburg